Vernon Forrest (February 12, 1971 – July 25, 2009) was an American professional boxer who competed from 1992 to 2008. He held multiple world championships in two weight classes, including the WBC, IBF, Ring magazine and lineal welterweight between 2002 and 2003, and the WBC super welterweight title twice between 2007 and 2009. In 2002, Forrest was named Fighter of the Year by The Ring and the Boxing Writers Association of America.

In 2009, Forrest was murdered after he was robbed at a gas station in the Mechanicsville neighborhood of Atlanta, Georgia.

Early years and amateur career
A native of Augusta, Georgia, Forrest began boxing at the age of 9. After compiling an impressive 225-16 record as an amateur, he became the 1992 US junior welterweight champion, and won silver at the 1991 World Amateur Boxing Championships, losing in the finals to Kostya Tszyu. Forrest was the first in his family to graduate from high school receiving his diploma from Marquette Senior High School in Marquette, Michigan.  Staying in Marquette, Forrest was on scholarship to Northern Michigan University where he majored in business administration through the U.S. Olympic Education Center. Forrest continued to train with the US National Team under head coach Al Mitchell.

He was a member of the 1992 US Olympic Team during the Summer Olympics in Barcelona, Spain. He earned his Olympic position by beating Shane Mosley in the trials. After that fight, Forrest was the gold medal favorite heading into the tournament. He would have to fight Cuban fighter Hector Vinent, a gold medallist, before reaching that goal. However, he was stricken with food poisoning a day before his first round bout and was beaten by Peter Richardson, who he'd previously defeated in a fight at the 1991 World Amateur Boxing Championships en route to winning the silver medal. He returned home to Augusta, then moved to Las Vegas, and made his professional debut on November 25, 1992.

Professional career
In his professional debut in November 1992, Forrest defeated Charles Hawkins. Through 1996, Forrest stopped 13 out of 15 opponents. Five were stopped in the first round.

As the years went by Forrest won a few minor title belts. In the year 2000 Forrest finally got his chance to fight for a major title belt against Raul Frank (for the IBF welterweight title). Unfortunately for Forrest however, a cut caused by an accidental head butt ended the bout in round three and the fight was ruled a no contest.

IBF welterweight champion
Forrest met Frank again in a rematch at Madison Square Garden on May 15, 2001, on a Félix Trinidad undercard. Forrest dominated his opponent and won the fight by a unanimous decision to claim his first major professional boxing title.

Forrest vs Mosley I, II
In 2001, Forrest fought the WBC and lineal welterweight champion, Shane Mosley. Many considered Mosley to be the best fighter in the world, and he was the betting favorite to win the fight.  Despite being the favorite, Mosley was dominated in this bout.  Both fighters initially started strong, landing hard blows, but in the second round Forrest had Mosley hurt early and knocked him down for the first time in his career.  A series of strong punches would put him down yet again later in the round.  With his dominant performance, Forrest was also awarded the Ring Magazine welterweight title.

Six months later, Forrest once again squared off against Mosley in a rematch.  Despite a stronger performance from Mosley, Forrest won a clear cut decision, using his jab more effectively and through superior ring generalship.  Forrest was now considered by many to be one of the top fighters in the world.

Forrest vs. Mayorga I, II
In January 2003, Forrest fought the WBA welterweight champion, Ricardo Mayorga.  Mayorga was a mostly unknown fringe contender from Nicaragua and few gave him a chance to win against the significantly bigger and stronger Forrest.  Mayorga shocked the world when he easily dominated Forrest, dropping him once in the first round and again in the third round.  The referee would call off the fight after the second knockdown, as Forrest was visibly dazed and unable to get his footing.

Forrest would rematch Mayorga six months later, losing again, this time by a majority decision.  The bout was close and competitive, with Mayorga mostly chasing Forrest around the ring while Forrest was content to fight from the outside.

Comeback trail
Forrest took two years off from fighting because of injuries; Forrest had complete reconstructive surgery on his left arm. He had three surgeries two on his shoulder to repair a torn rotator cuff and one on his left elbow to repair torn cartilage and nerve damages.

In his first fight since losing twice to Mayorga, Forrest knocked out Sergio Rios in two rounds. After the fight against Rios, Forrest stopped Elco Garcia in the tenth round.

Forrest won a controversial ten round unanimous decision over Ike Quartey on August 5, 2006, at Madison Square Theatre, New York City. The judges at ringside scored the fight, 95-94, 95-94, and 96-93.

On July 28, 2007, Forrest won a unanimous decision against Carlos Baldomir in Tacoma, Washington, frequently firing off heavy right blows at Baldomir. After twelve rounds, Forrest won a lopsided 118-109, 116-111, 118-109 decision to take the vacant WBC light middleweight title.

On December 1, 2007, at Foxwoods Resort Casino, he successfully defended his light middleweight title against Italian Michele Piccirillo, scoring an eleventh-round TKO.

Forrest vs. Mora
On June 7, 2008, Forrest lost his title to The Contender winner Sergio Mora via a 12-round majority decision. In the build-up to the fight, Forrest referred to Mora as "the pretender" and threatened to send him "out on a stretcher". However, Mora succeeded in pulling off the upset victory. The final scores were 114-114, 115-113 and 116-112 in favor of Mora.

Reclaiming the title
Forrest reclaimed his WBC 154-pound title on September 14, 2008, against Sergio Mora via unanimous decision, the judges scores were 118-109, 117-110, and 119-110.

Charity work
Forrest was involved directly with the creation of the Not for Profit Destiny's Child, a group home that assists people with developmental, emotional, and psychological disabilities and needs. Forrest was also involved directly with helping the clients by organizing Destiny's Child's activities.

Murder
At about 11:00 pm EDT on July 25, 2009, Forrest stopped at a gas station in the Atlanta neighborhood of Mechanicsville. With him was his 11-year-old godson. As the boy went inside the gas station, Forrest went to the back of his car to add air to a low tire. As this occurred, a man robbed him at gunpoint and fled. Forrest, who was armed, went after the man and shots were exchanged. After a short distance, Forrest gave up the chase and began talking to a second man. It was this man that shot Forrest seven to eight times in the back. According to police, the shooter and a second person left the scene in a red Pontiac. Forrest died at the scene and the death was ruled a homicide. Atlanta Police would arrest and later charge 25-year-old Jquante Crews, 20-year-old Demario Ware and 30-year-old Charman Sinkfield for his murder. It is believed that Sinkfield was the shooter, Ware was the robber, and Crews was the driver. Crews and Ware are serving life sentences. (Georgia Department of Corrections). On October 28, 2016, Charman Sinkfield was sentenced to life without parole.

Professional boxing record

References

External links

Vernon Forrest obituary in the Atlanta Journal-Constitution
Vernon Forrest obituary at The Daily Telegraph

Boxers from Atlanta
Boxers at the 1992 Summer Olympics
Deaths by firearm in Georgia (U.S. state)
International Boxing Federation champions
Male murder victims
Murdered African-American people
Olympic boxers of the United States
Boxers from Augusta, Georgia (U.S. state)
People murdered in Georgia (U.S. state)
World Boxing Council champions
Winners of the United States Championship for amateur boxers
1971 births
2009 deaths
American male boxers
AIBA World Boxing Championships medalists
Light-welterweight boxers
The Ring (magazine) champions
World welterweight boxing champions
World light-middleweight boxing champions